The Obuasi Constituency was a constituency in the Obuasi Municipal District in the Ashanti Region of Ghana. In 2003, the Electoral Commission of Ghana, created 30 new constituencies in the  country by dividing certain already existing ones. With the Obuasi constituency, it was split into the Obuasi and Akrofuom with Obuasi and Akrofuom as their headquarters. The Obuasi constituency was further split in 2011 into the Obuasi West and Obuasi East constituencies.

Members of Parliament 

The constituency was split in 2012 into the Obuasi East and Obuasi West constituencies.

See also
List of Ghana Parliament constituencies

References 

Parliamentary constituencies in the Ashanti Region